Bekkhan Yunuzovich Mankiev (born September 15, 1986) is a male wrestler from Russia.

His older brother Nazyr Mankiev is an olympic gold medalist.

References 
 
 wrestrus.ru

Living people
1986 births
Russian male sport wrestlers
World Wrestling Championships medalists
European Wrestling Championships medalists